Arktida (Cyrillic, Арктида) is a Russian band that was formed in 2003 in Moscow, Russia. Its genre is power metal with influences of symphonic metal.

History 
The band was formed on March 2, 2003 in the city of Moscow, Russia under the name of Arkaim. Soon before releasing their first full-length album, they realized their name was not too unique. Because of this, they changed the name of the band to Arktida.

Initially, there were just three members of this band. Alexander Tratsky, who was the drummer, and also the founder of the band, Vladimir Lebedev, the singer and songwriter, and guitarist and composer, Denis Boatmen. On March 2, 2003, the band formed and had their first session together. They all decided to dedicate their music to the genre of power metal. A little later into the band's existence, the bassist and guitarist, Basil Smolin and Alexander Prikhodchenko joined the group. On April 6, with their new line-up, they played their first successful gig. Later in the summer of 2003, Dimitry Mashkov joined as the keyboardist and they toured Russia until the beginning of winter. In February 2004, Alexander Prikhodchenko left the group. In autumn of 2004, the group started recording their first EP entitled, Cry of a Hero, which ended in early spring of 2005. They soon released two more EPs entitled, Nothing to Lose (2005), and The Right Strong (2006).

The turning point in the group's history happened when Denis Boatmen and Dmitry Mashkov went to study in the city of Moscow. The group had disbanded for a while due to this, but the guitarist and keyboardist urged the rest of the group to reassemble in the nation's capital. They had saved the name and much of the material they had made, luckily, just for this. They were constantly on the lookout for new drummers and bassists, and with luck, they found a pair. Their names were Valery Zolotaev and Alexander Ovchinnikov. Their first Moscow rehearsal was in September 2006, and in November of that year, they had found a new singer. His name was Konstantin Savchenko. Konstantin was also a composer, and soon, the band's repertoire was filled with fresh material. The band had performed multiple concerts (both indoor and outdoor), and recorded three audio collections: an EP and two full-length albums.

On October 8, 2008, the band released their album On the Horizon under the label of Metalism Records, which consisted of 17 tracks. After the disc was released, the band agreed upon making a video for the song "Nothing to Lose". On February 1, 2010, work on the video had been completed and it was released.

In December 2009, the band recorded a cover of the Russian folk song, "Oh, Frost, Frost".

On June 20, 2010, the band released a single for their song, "Do Not Cry" from their upcoming album, Through the Centuries.

On April 1, 2011, the band released a second album, Through the Centuries. It came with 16 songs, including Do Not Cry, a cover of "Eagleheart" by Stratovarius, and a cover of the Russian folk song, "Oh, Frost, Frost", which was written for a project called Salt.

On December 28 of 2011, it was announced that the group had split up. Denis Boatmen, Valery Zolotaev, Konstantin Savchenko and Alexander Ovchinnikov created their own band called, NickName, and reserved the rights to the songs of the old repertoire.

The New Composition 
On April 11, 2012, the group introduced a new structure and a cover of "I'm Alive" by Helloween. The remaining members decided to bring the band back up again and introduced Alex Podgorny and vocalist Sergey Lobanov. In addition, their original bassist returned as well.

On September 3 of that year, the group announced that their new vocalist, Sergey Lobanov, would be unable to perform due to tragic circumstances. He was replaced by Michael Nakhimovic for the time being.

On December 1, guitarist Dimitry Chernikov and drummer Vladimir Alyoshkin joined the band.

In the spring of 2013, Dimitry Chernikov had left the band and was replaced by Anton Volobrinsky.

Style 
This band is most well known for playing power metal with a mixed element of symphonic metal.

Members

Current members 
Dmitry Mashkov - Keyboards (2003–present)
Vladimir Alyoshkin - Drums (2012–present)
Sergey Lobanov - Vocals (2012-2016, 2016-2018, 2020-present)
Vasily Koshelev - Guitars (2016-2018, 2018–present)

Former Members 
Vasily Smolin - Bass (2003-2006, 2012-2015)
Alexander Tratsky - Drums (2003-2006)
Alexander Prikhodchenko - Guitars (2003-2004)
Denis Burlakov - Guitars (2003-2012)
Vladimir Lebedev - Vocals (2003-2006)
Valery Zolotayev - Bass (2006-2012)
Alexander Ovchinnikov - Drums (2006-2012)
Konstantin Savchenko - Vocals (2006-2012)
Alexey Podgorny - Guitars (2012)
Dmitry Chernikov - Guitars (2012-2013)
Anton Volobrinsky - Guitars (2013-2016)
Dmitriy Rodina - Vocals (2016)
Sergey Ovchinnikov - Bass (2016-2018)
Sergey Podkosov - Vocals (2019-2020)

Timeline

Discography 

Studio albums:
 On the Horizon (2008)
 Through the Centuries (2011)
 Remember (2015)

EPs:
 You Should Not Cry (2010)
 My Friend (2012)
 Duty and Right (2017)

Demo albums:
 Cry of a Hero (2005)
 Nothing to Lose (2005)
 The Right Strong (2006)

Covers:
 "Nightmare" - Axel Rudi Pell (2005)
 "The Chosen Ones" - Dream Evil (2008)
 "Oh, Frost, Frost" - Russian folk song (2009)
 "Who Are You?" - Aria (2010)
 "Eagleheart" - Stratovarius (2011)
 "I'm Alive" - Helloween (2012)
 "Master" - Master (2013)
 "Spell" - Mavrin (2013)
 "Kickstart My Heart" - Mötley Crüe (2015)

Websites 

 Official Website

Sources 

Russian power metal musical groups